Amerine is a surname. Notable people with the surname include:

 Jason Amerine (born 1971), lieutenant colonel in the United States Army Special Forces
 Maynard Amerine (1911–1998), American pioneering researcher of wine